Father of Four in the Country is a 1955 Danish family film directed by Alice O'Fredericks. It was produced under the ASA Film studio banner.

Cast
Karl Stegger as Far 
Birgitte Bruun as Søs 
Otto Møller Jensen as Ole 
Rudi Hansen as Mie 
Ole Neumann as Lille Per 
Peter Malberg as Onkel Anders 
Ib Mossin as Peter 
Hanne Winther-Jørgensen as Rigmor 
Louis Miehe-Renard as Lars Peter 
Hans Henrik Dahl as Kjeld 
Dorte Bjørndal as Hanne 
Marie Brink as Fru Mikkelsen

External links

1955 films
1950s Danish-language films
Danish black-and-white films
Films directed by Alice O'Fredericks
Films scored by Sven Gyldmark
ASA Filmudlejning films
Father of Four
Danish comedy films
1955 comedy films